Rivingtons may refer to 

The Rivingtons, a 1960s doo-wop group
Rivington or Rivington's, an English publishing house